Pachatusan (Quechua pacha earth, tusa, a prop to support a wall or building, pachatusa prop of the earth, -n a suffix) is a mountain northeast of the city of Cusco in the Andes of Peru, about  high. It is located in the Cusco Region, Calca Province, San Salvador District, in the Cusco Province, in the districts San Jerónimo and Saylla, and in the Quispicanchi Province, Oropesa District. It is situated on the western bank of the Vilcanota River, beside the mountain Huaypun in the south-east. Pachatusan lies above the sanctuary of San Salvador named Señor de Huanca.

By the local people Pachatusan is venerated as an apu.

On February 16, 2009, the cultural archaeological landscape of Pachatusan was declared a National Cultural Heritage by Resolución Directoral Nacional No. 231/INC.

Gallery

See also 
 Anawarkhi
 Araway Qhata
 Pikchu
 Pillku Urqu
 Sinqa
 Wanakawri

References

Mountains of Peru
Mountains of Cusco Region
Archaeological sites in Peru
Archaeological sites in Cusco Region